There are 67 native species of mammals in Rocky Mountain National Park, a  park in Colorado. Species are listed by common name, scientific name, habitat, and abundance. Species which are extirpated, or locally extinct, are marked with an EX.

Pronghorn
Order: Artiodactyla
Family: Antilocapridae

Pronghorn, Antilocapra americana, meadows, grasslands, sagebrush, occasional

Bovids

Order: Artiodactyla
Family: Bovidae

American bison, Bos bison, meadows, grasslands, tundra, extirpated EX
Aurochs, Bos taurus, meadows, Ex, E
Mountain goat, Oreamnos americanus, cliffs, rocky areas, occasional (non-native)
Bighorn sheep, Ovis canadensis, cliffs, rocky areas, tundra, common

Moose, elk, and deer

Order: Artiodactyla
Family: Cervidae

Moose, Alces alces, montane and subalpine forests, riparian, meadows, uncommon
Elk, Cervus elaphus, montane and subalpine forests, meadows, tundra, abundant
Mule deer, Odocoileus hemionus, montane and subalpine forests, meadows, common
White-tailed deer, Odocoileus virginianus, montane forests, meadows, occasional

Canids
Order: Carnivora
Family: Canidae

Coyote, Canis latrans, montane and subalpine forests, meadows, tundra, common
Gray wolf, Canis lupus, montane and subalpine forests, meadows, tundra, extirpated EX
Gray fox, Urocyon cineoargentus, montane forests, meadows, unconfirmed
Red fox, Vulpes vulpes, montane and subalpine forests, meadows, common

Cats
Order: Carnivora
Family: Felidae

Canada lynx, Lynx canadensis, subalpine forests, rare
Bobcat, Lynx rufus, montane and subalpine forests, meadows, common
Cougar, Puma concolor, montane and subalpine forests, uncommon

Skunks
Order: Carnivora
Family: Mephitidae

Striped skunk, Mephitis mephitis, montane forests, meadows, riparian, uncommon
Western spotted skunk, Spilogale gracilis, montane forests, meadows, riparian, rare

Weasels

Order: Carnivora
Family: Mustelidae

Wolverine, Gulo gulo, subalpine forests, alpine tundra, occasional
North American river otter, Lontra canadensis, rivers, riparian, uncommon
American marten, Martes americana, montane and subalpine forests, uncommon
Ermine, Mustela erminea, montane and subalpine forests, alpine tundra, meadows, uncommon
Long-tailed weasel, Mustela frenata, montane and subalpine forests, alpine tundra, meadows, common
American mink, Mustela vison, rivers, lakes, riparian, rare
American badger, Taxidea taxus, meadows, grasslands, uncommon

Raccoons and Ringtails
Order: Carnivora
Family: Procyonidae

Common raccoon, Procyon lotor, montane forests, riparian, uncommon
Ring-tailed cat, Bassariscus astutus, montane forests, riparian, rare, if present

Bears
Order: Carnivora
Family: Ursidae

Grizzly bear, Ursus arctos, montane and subalpine forests, alpine tundra, meadows, extirpated EX
American black bear, Ursus americanus, montane and subalpine forests, common

Bats
Order: Chiroptera
Family: Vespertilionidae

Silver-haired bat, Lasionycteris noctivagans, montane and subalpine forests, riparian, meadows, common
Hoary bat, Lasiurus cinereus, montane and subalpine forests, riparian, meadows, uncommon
Western small-footed myotis, Myotis ciliolabrum, montane forests, riparian, meadows rare, if present
Long-eared myotis, Myotis evotis, montane and subalpine forests, riparian, meadows, uncommon
Little brown bat, Myotis lucifugus, montane and subalpine forests, riparian, meadows, uncommon
Big brown bat, Eptesicus fuscus, montane and subalpine forests, riparian, meadows, rare, if present
Long-legged myotis, Myotis volans, montane forests, riparian, meadows, uncommon
Townsend's big-eared bat, Plecotus townsendii, montane and subalpine forest, riparian, meadows, rare, if present

Free-tailed bats
Order: Chiroptera
Family: Molossidae

Brazilian free-tailed bat, Tadarida brasiliensis, montane forests, meadows, rocky areas, rare, if present

Hares and rabbits

Order: Lagomorpha
Family: Leporidae

Snowshoe hare, Lepus americanus, montane and subalpine forests, meadows, alpine tundra, common
White-tailed jackrabbit, Lepus townsendii, montane and subalpine forests, meadows, alpine tundra, rare
Mountain cottontail, Sylvilagus nuttallii, montane forests, riparian, meadows, uncommon
Eastern cottontail, Sylvilagus floridanus, montane forests, rare, if present

Pikas

Order: Lagomorpha
Family: Ochotonidae

American pika, Ochotona princeps, rocky areas, alpine tundra, common

Beavers
Order: Rodentia
Family: Castoridae

American beaver, Castor canadensis, rivers, streams, lakes, riparian, uncommon

Voles and mice
Order: Rodentia
Family: Cricetidae

Southern red-backed vole, Clethrionomys gapperi, montane and subalpine forests, common
Long-tailed vole, Microtus longicaudis, montane and subalpine forests, meadows, riparian, uncommon
Montane vole, Microtus montanus, meadows, riparian, common
Meadow vole, Microtus pennsylvanicus, meadows, riparian, rare, if present
Sagebrush vole, Lagurus curtatus, meadows, sagebrush flats, rare, if present
Bushy-tailed woodrat, Neotoma cinerea, montane and subalpine forests, meadows, riparian, uncommon
Mexican woodrat, Neotoma mexicana, montane forests, meadows, riparian, rare, if present
Common muskrat, Ondatra zibethicus, marshes, lakes, riparian, uncommon
Deer mouse, Peromyscus maniculatus, montane and subalpine forests, meadows, riparian, alpine tundra, abundant
Northern rock mouse, Peromyscus nasutus, montane forests, meadows, riparian, uncommon
Western heather vole, Phenacomus intermedius, montane and subalpine forests, meadows, alpine tundra, uncommon

Jumping mice
Order: Rodentia
Family: Dipodidae

Western jumping mouse, Zapus princeps, deciduous forests, meadows, riparian, common

Porcupines

Order: Rodentia
Family: Erethizontidae

North American porcupine, Erethizon dorsatum, montane and subalpine forests, riparian, uncommon

Pocket gophers
Order: Rodentia
Family: Geomyidae

Northern pocket gopher, Thomomys talpoides, meadows, alpine tundra, common

Squirrels

Order: Rodentia
Family: Sciuridae

Yellow-bellied marmot, Marmota flaviventris, montane and subalpine forests, meadows, alpine tundra, common
Abert's squirrel, Sciurus aberti, montane ponderosa pine forests, uncommon
Fox squirrel, Sciurus niger, riparian, rare (Non-native)
Wyoming ground squirrel, Urocitellus elegans, montane forests, meadows, common
Golden-mantled ground squirrel, Spermophilus lateralis, montane and subalpine forests, meadows, riparian, common
Rock squirrel, Spermophilus variegiatus, montane forests, rare, if present
Least chipmunk, Tamias minimas, montane and subalpine forests, meadows, riparian, common
Colorado chipmunk, Tamias quadrivittatus, montane forests, meadows, rare, if present
Uinta chipmunk, Neotamias umbrinus, montane and subalpine forests, meadows, riparian, common
Pine squirrel, Tamiasciurus hudsonicus, montane and subalpine forests, riparian, common

Shrews
Order: Soricomorpha
Family: Soricidae

Masked shrew, Sorex cinereus, montane and subalpine forests, riparian, meadow, alpine tundra, common
American pygmy shrew, Sorex hoyi, montane and subalpine forests, riparian, meadow, uncommon
Montane shrew, Sorex monticolus, montane and subalpine forests, riparian, meadow, common
Dwarf shrew, Sorex nanus, subalpine forests, meadow, alpine tundra, rare
American water shrew, Sorex palustris, lakes, streams, marshes, riparian, uncommon

References

Rocky Mountain National Park